RNLB Harriot Dixon (ON 770) is a retired  lifeboat of the Royal National Lifeboat Institution, that was stationed at  in Norfolk in eastern England. Launched in 1934, she served for thirty years as the No 2 lifeboat at Cromer. She was launched 55 times and was responsible for saving the lives of 20 people. Dixon road, in the southern part of Cromer, is named after the lifeboat.

History
The  motor lifeboat Harriot Dixon was built by Groves and Guttridge Ltd, on the Isle of Wight. She took up station at the beach lifeboat house on 2 August 1934 and remained at station as the No 2 lifeboat for thirty years until 15 June 1964. This lifeboat had been funded from a legacy of £3,750 left by William Edward Dixon, a surgeon, of West Worthing of the then county of Sussex (Now West Sussex). Mr Dixon had died in 1921 and had left the money to fund a lifeboat to be named after his mother and if possible to be stationed on the Kentish or east coast. Harriot Dixon went on to be the longest serving motor lifeboat at Cromer.

Rescues and service

References

Cromer lifeboats
1934 ships
Liverpool-class lifeboats